Masking tape, also known as painter's tape, is a type of pressure-sensitive tape made of a thin and easy-to-tear paper, and an easily released pressure-sensitive adhesive. It is available in a variety of widths. It is used mainly in painting, to mask off areas that should not be painted. 

The adhesive is the key element to its usefulness, as it allows the tape to be easily removed without leaving residue or damaging the surface to which it is applied. The tape is available in several strengths, rated on a 1–100 scale based on the strength of the adhesive. Most painting operations will require a tape in the 50 range. Household masking tape is made of an even weaker paper and lower-grade adhesive.

History
Masking tape was created in 1925 by 3M employee Richard Drew.  Drew observed autobody workers growing frustrated when they removed butcher paper they had taped to cars they were painting. The strong adhesive on the tape peeled off some of the paint they had just applied. Touching up the damaged areas increased their costs. Drew realized the need for tape with a gentler adhesive.

Usage
For its original use of marking off areas where body paint is not desired, a special grade of painter's masking tape is needed. With this special grade, very clean lines can be produced. Without it, the paint bleeds under the edges of the tape, producing a fuzzy or varied line.

Drafting tape looks similar to ordinary household masking tape, but has a lower tack.  It is intended to hold blueprints to a drawing board or light table, and to pull off easily without damaging the drawing.

House painter's tape is rated by how many days it can be left up without leaving residue on the surface being masked.  It is available in 1-, 3-, 7-, 14-, 30-, and 60-day ratings, with the 7- and 14-day tapes being the most common.  The longer-rated tapes are typically less adhesive, and are sold for use on smooth, delicate surfaces such as vinyl wallpaper and recently painted walls. Painter's (decorator's) tape in the U.S is most often the blue variety or sometimes purple in color as opposed to the tan or off white household masking tape.  Spraying WD-40 is a popular way to remove any sticky residue.

Masking tape is also used in long strips on larger glass panes in situations where the glass might be shattered, harming those in the vicinity.

Other types

When constructed with plastic films instead of paper, masking tapes can be used for more rigorous applications. Polyester-based tapes are used to mask off during etching, plating, and in particular, powder coating.  Tapes based on polyimide films can resist molten solder in electronics applications.  Glass cloth tapes are often used in powder coating and sandblasting operations. Foil or vinyl tapes are often used in plating.  Layered tapes made from multiple materials laminated together can be used for masking flame spray, thermal spray and HVOF. Masking tape can also be used to adhere posters to walls up to the day rating. Masking tape can basically be used for any purpose required of it, and is not limited solely to painting needs.

The adhesive applied to a tape is often a critical determining factor for a given masking situation.  There are three thin types of adhesives (with many chemical variations of each): rubber-based, acrylic-based, and silicone-based.  Rubber-based adhesives generally provide the greatest adhesion, but the lowest temperature resistance.  Acrylic-based adhesives offer a wide temperature range, providing adhesion from sub-freezing temperatures up to 275–325 °F (about 150 °C).  Silicone-based adhesives provide the highest temperature resistance, with some tapes (such as some polyimide films and glass cloth tapes) allowing for intermittent use up to 500 °F (260 °C).

See also
 List of adhesive tapes
 Chemistry of adhesive tapes
 Adhesive tape

References

External links

How to Remove Masking Tape Residue

American inventions
Adhesive tape